Aquatics at the 1965 Southeast Asian Peninsular Games included swimming, diving, and waterpolo events. The sports of aquatics were held at Kuala Lumpur, Malaysia. Aquatics events was held between 15 December to 18 December.

Swimming
Men's events

Women's events

Diving

Waterpolo

Medal table

References
http://eresources.nlb.gov.sg/newspapers/Digitised/Issue/straitstimes19651216.aspx
http://eresources.nlb.gov.sg/newspapers/Digitised/Issue/straitstimes19651217.aspx
http://eresources.nlb.gov.sg/newspapers/Digitised/Issue/straitstimes19651218.aspx
http://eresources.nlb.gov.sg/newspapers/Digitised/Issue/straitstimes19651219.aspx

Southeast Asian Peninsular Games
Events at the 1965 Southeast Asian Peninsular Games
1965